Manson Youth Institution is a Connecticut Department of Correction state prison for men under the age of 21. It is located in Cheshire, New Haven County, Connecticut. Although it has a capacity of 679, it currently houses less than half that (322 as of June 2019).

References

Prisons in Connecticut
Buildings and structures in New Haven County, Connecticut
1982 establishments in Connecticut